Diaphania mirabilis is a moth in the family Crambidae. It was described by Herbert Druce in 1902. It is found in Guyana, Brazil, Ecuador, Peru and Bolivia. The habitat consists of cloud forests.

The length of the forewings is 13–15 mm for males and 13.6–16 mm for females. The forewings are dark brown with an intense purple gloss. There is a translucent, almost rectangular band of half the length of the hindwings.

References

Moths described in 1902
Diaphania